A BOSU Balance Trainer (or BOSU ball) is a fitness training device, invented in 1999 by David Weck. It consists of an inflated rubber hemisphere attached to a rigid platform.  The device is often used for balance training.  When the dome side faces up, the BOSU ball provides an unstable surface while the device remains stable.  This combination of stable/unstable allows a wide range of users, from the young, elderly, or injured to the elite level athlete.  With the dome side up, the device can be used for athletic drills and aerobic activities. The device can be flipped over so that the platform faces up.  In this position, the device is highly unstable and can be used for other forms of exercise.

The name initially came from an acronym standing for “Both Sides Up" - a reference to the two ways a BOSU ball can be positioned.  It is also referred to as the "blue half-ball", because it looks like a stability ball cut in half. The acronym now favored by the creators is "BOth Sides Utilised".

Criticism and benefits

In a scientific experiment conducted at Eastern Illinois University in 2009, twelve men performed various physical exercises (back squat, deadlift, overhead press, and curl lifts) with and without the BOSU ball. Using the BOSU ball did not create a real difference in the activity of their muscles. Therefore, it was concluded that the BOSU ball did not bring a significant improvement for these physical exercises and that these exercises performed on stable grounds were as efficient as the ones performed on the BOSU ball. A second study which concentrated on single-leg stance shows very similar results (no difference in muscle activity with and without the BOSU ball). However, an unstable surface increases activation of the rectus abdominis and allows for greater activity per exercise when compared to a stable surface. Exercises such as a curl-up on an exercise ball yields a greater amount of electromyography (EMG) activity compared to exercises on a stable platform.

References

External links
BOSU homepage
BOSU inventor's homepage

Exercise equipment
Exercise-related trademarks